Gyeonggyojang is a Japanese home built in Korea under Japanese rule located Jongno-gu, Seoul. From November 4, 1945 to 1949, it was Kim Gu's private residence and official residence, the Provisional Government of the Republic of Korea, and the headquarters of Korea Independence Party. From 1949 to 1952, it was used as the embassy building of the Republic of China in Korea.

History 
Gyeonggyojang was Choi Chang-hak's villa, but after handing it over to Kim Gu, he lived here and was assassinated by Ahn Doo-hee on June 26, 1949.

General outline 
Gyeonggyojang was located across the East Theater between Gwanghwamun and Seodaemun, which is the site of Samsung Medical Center in Pyeong-dong, Jongno-gu, near Seodaemun Station. The Japanese-style house, which was built with a total floor area of 396.692 and a total floor area of 945.452, was called Jukcheomjang when it was completed in 1938. After Korea's liberation from Japan's colonial rule on August 15, Choi Chang-hak provided Kim Gu's residence, and instead of the Japanese name Jukcheomjang, Kim Gu changed his name to Gyeonggyo, which was named after nearest bridge's name.

Kim Gu, who returned to Korea in November 1945 with members of the Provisional Government, led activities, counter-tests and unification campaigns for the founding of the country while living here until he was assassinated by Ahn Doo-hee at the office of the head of the Gyeonggyojang on June 26, 1949.

Since then, it has been returned to Choi Chang-hak and used again as the residence of the Embassy of the Republic of China, but its owner has changed several times, including the presence of U.S. special forces during the Korean War. It was purchased by the Samsung Foundation in 1967 and was built by attaching the main building of Korea Hospital (currently Gangbuk Samsung Hospital) to the back of the building, and was used as a hospital entrance for a long time.

Originally designated as Seoul Tangible Cultural Heritage No. 129 on April 6, 2001, it was promoted to National Designated Cultural Heritage No. 465 on June 13, 2005 after the importance of the building in modern and contemporary Korean history was reevaluated. Kim Koo's old office, located on the second floor of the building and west of the building, was also operated by Samsung as Kim Koo's memorial hall.

On August 14, 2009, the entire Gyeonggyojang was to be restored after 60 years, and all the hospital facilities in the building were moved and the construction began in March 2011 and opened on March 1, 2013.

References 

Buildings and structures in Seoul
1938 establishments in Korea